James K. Bates (June 24, 1806 Windham County, Connecticut - June 30, 1872 Watertown, Jefferson County, New York) was an American physician and politician from New York.

Life
He was the son of James Bates and Linda (Fairbanks) Bates (b. 1781). He married Serena L. Massey and they had three children.

He was an Inspector of State Prisons from 1861 to 1866, elected in 1860 on the Republican ticket, and in 1863 on the Union ticket.

Sources
The New York Civil List compiled by Franklin Benjamin Hough, Stephen C. Hutchins and Edgar Albert Werner (1867; pages 411 and 536)
 Bates genealogy, at Family Origins [gives Thompson, Connecticut as birthplace]
Genealogy of the Fairbanks Family in America, 1633-1897 by Lorenzo Sayles Fairbanks (Printed for the author by the American Print. and Engraving Co., 1897)
The Growth of a Century: As Illustrated in the History of Jefferson County, New York, from 1793 to 1894 by John A Haddock & Eli Thayer (Weed-Parsons Printing Company, 1894) [gives Killingly, Connecticut as birthplace]
Death notice of his daughter Frances J. Bates, aged 20, in NYT on December 25, 1856

1806 births
1872 deaths
People from Windham County, Connecticut
Politicians from Watertown, New York
New York State Prison Inspectors
19th-century American physicians
New York (state) Republicans